Proline-rich nuclear receptor coactivator 1 is a protein that, in humans, is encoded by the PNRC1 gene.

Function 

PNRC1 functions as a coactivator for several nuclear receptors including AR, ERα, ERRα, ERRγ, GR, SF1, PR, TR, RAR and RXR. The interaction between PNRC1 with nuclear receptors occurs through the SH3 domain of PNRC1.

References

Further reading

External links
 
 

Gene expression
Transcription coregulators